Taipei Flight Skywalkers F.C. is a professional football club based in Taipei, Taiwan which currently competes in the Taiwan Football Challenge League.

History
The club was formed in 2021 after the Zhanyi Group took over the license of Red Lions, who had previously competed in the league from 2018 to 2020. The new owners opted to relaunch the club as a new entity, branding the new side Flight Skywalkers with a new crest and kit. The team in its maiden season was mainly supplied by Taipei City University of Science and Technology.

Current squad

References

2021 establishments in Taiwan
Football clubs in Taiwan
Association football clubs established in 2021